This is an overview of the progression of the World record in track para-cycling for the Individual pursuit as recognised by the Union Cycliste Internationale (UCI).

Current classifications

C5 Progression (4000m)

C4 Progression (4000m)

C3 Progression (3000m)

C2 Progression (3000m)

C1 Progression (3000m)

B Progression (4000m)

References

Track cycling world record progressions
Men's individual pursuit